KCOL-FM (92.5 FM, "Cool 92.5") is a radio station broadcasting a classic hits format.  Licensed to the suburb of Groves, Texas, it serves the Beaumont-Port Arthur metropolitan area.  Its studios are located southeast of the I-10/US 69 interchange in Beaumont, and its transmitter is located in Bridge City, Texas.

History
Voice in the Wilderness Broadcasting was granted a Construction Permit to build a 3 kilowatt Class A radio facility on 92.1 MHz in 1983. The CP was assigned the call sign KTFA on  June 27, 1983. KTFA was upgraded to the current 50 kilowatt C2 class in 1990, which involved the change in frequency to 92.5, so as not to interfere with co-operating channel KRTS serving the Houston area. The station has had only two owners in its lifetime, having been proposed, built, and initially licensed to Voice in the Wilderness, and currently owned by iHeartMedia, Inc.

KCOL-FM HD2 broadcasts a country love songs format which is also available on the iHeart Radio app.

References

External links
Cool 92.5 Website

Classic hits radio stations in the United States
COL-FM
Radio stations established in 1983
IHeartMedia radio stations